Z35 was the lead ship of her class of destroyers built for the Kriegsmarine (German Navy) during World War II. Completed in late 1943, the ship spent the war in the Baltic Sea, escorting German ships, laying minefields, and bombarding Soviet forces. On 12 December 1944, a navigational error caused her to enter a German minefield as she was preparing to lay another minefield in the Gulf of Finland off the Estonian coast. Z35 struck one or more mines and sank with the loss of all but 70 crewmen. The wreck was discovered and surveyed in 1994.

Design and description
The Type 1936B design retained the hull design of the Type 1936A, but reverted to the lighter main armament of the Type 1936 to reduce topweight and improve seakeeping. Their crew consisted of 11–15 officers and 305–20 sailors.

The Type 1936B ships carried five  SK C/34 guns in single mounts with gun shields, two each superimposed, fore and aft of the superstructure. The fifth mount was positioned on top of the rear deckhouse. The guns were designated No. 1 to 5 from front to rear. Their anti-aircraft armament consisted of four  SK C/30 guns in two twin mounts abreast the rear funnel and fifteen  C/38 guns in three quadruple and three single mounts. The ship carried eight above-water  torpedo tubes in two power-operated mounts. Two reloads were provided for each mount. They had four depth charge launchers and mine rails could be fitted on the rear deck that had a maximum capacity of 74–76 mines. 'GHG' (Gruppenhorchgerät) passive hydrophones were fitted to detect submarines and an S-Gerät sonar was also probably fitted. The ships were equipped with a FuMO 24/25 radar set above the bridge.

Construction and career
Z35 was originally ordered as a Type 1938B destroyer from AG Weser (Deschimag) on 28 June 1939, but the contract was cancelled when the Type 1938B design was abandoned, and the ship was reordered as a Type 1936A (Mob) destroyer. That was changed to a Type 1936B on 17 February 1941. She was laid down as yard number W1005 on 6 June at Deschimag's Bremen shipyard, launched on 2 October 1942 and commissioned on 22 September 1943 under the command of Korvettenkapitän (Lieutenant Commander) Niels Bätge. After working up Z35 was assigned to the 6. Zerstörerflotille (6th Destroyer Flotilla) in February 1944.

The four destroyers and single torpedo boat of the flotilla were transferred to the Gulf of Finland to support minelaying operations there, Z35 arriving at Reval, Estonia, on 13 February. The flotilla was initially tasked to escort convoys between Libau, Latvia, and Reval, but laid its first minefield in Narva Bay on 12 March while bombarding Soviet positions on the eastern shore of the bay. They were primarily tasked as minelayers through July, including reinforcing the existing minefields in the Gulf of Finland in April. In preparation for Operation Tanne West, the occupation of Åland in case of Finnish surrender, the flotilla escorted the heavy cruiser Lützow to the island of Utö on 28 June, but the operation was canceled and the ships returned to port.

On 30 July and 1 August Z35 and three other destroyers of the flotilla sailed into the Gulf of Riga to bombard Soviet positions inland. On 5 August, they escorted Prinz Eugen as she engaged targets on the island of Ösel, Estonia, and in Latvia on 19–20 August. That last day Z35 damaged one of her propellers on a rock and had to return to Gotenhafen for repairs. In September the flotilla covered the convoys evacuating Finland and then Reval. On 23 October a shell exploded prematurely in the barrel of No. 3 gun, wounding one man, and blowing the barrel and breech overboard. The following day Z35 was struck by splinters during a Soviet air attack. The following month, the flotilla and the heavy cruisers  and Prinz Eugen shelled Soviet positions during the evacuation of Sworbe between 20 and 24 November.

By mid-December, Z35 was the flagship of Kapitän zur See (Captain) Friedrich Kothe, commander of the 6. T23 was to escort the other ships and the destroyers were laden with 68 mines each. The mission was postponed to the night of 11/12 December because of bad weather and the flotilla sailed on the morning of the 11th. The weather gradually worsened over the course of the day and the spray and rain made navigation difficult. After a faint explosion was heard at about 01:52, Kothe radioed for T23 to close on Z35. Almost immediately afterwards, a mine struck the port side of the ship, abreast No. 4 gun, knocking out the port turbine and flooding one compartment. Z35 was not in any danger of sinking by 02:00 when Z36 struck a mine and sank very quickly with the loss of all hands. Shortly afterwards, Z35 suffered an explosion amidships, possibly from a boiler explosion that also detonated some ammunition. The crew abandoned ship before she sank, but only about 70 men were rescued by the Soviets.

Citations

Bibliography

Further reading

External links
Z35 on german-navy.de
German Destroyers on Battleships-Cruisers.co.uk

Type 1936B destroyers
Ships built in Bremen (state)
1943 ships
World War II shipwrecks in the Baltic Sea
Maritime incidents in December 1944
Ships sunk by mines
Shipwrecks in the Gulf of Finland
Naval magazine explosions